Benjamin Vaughan McCandlish (June 3, 1886 – October 16, 1975) was a United States Navy flag officer who served as the 36th Naval Governor of Guam and was a recipient of the Navy Cross.

Early life 
On June 3, 1886, McCandlish was born in Petersburg, Virginia. McCandlish was the fifth of six children of James Gray McCandlish (1854-1899) and Lelia Jane (nee Vaughan) McCandlish (1856-1937). McCandlish's siblings include, Elsie Gray McCandlish, Walter Taliaferro McCandlish, Lelia Vaughan 'Dee Dee' McCandlish, James Gray McCandlish, Jr. and Sarah Ellen 'Sadie' McCandlish.

Education 
In 1909, McCandlish earned a degree from the United States Naval Academy in 1909.

Career

Naval service
As an ensign, McCandlish served aboard , an armored cruiser that was renamed USS Saratoga in 1911.

For his actions, he received the Navy Cross as a lieutenant commander. McCandlish commanded a number of different-class vessels during the 1920s and 1930s until 12 August 1938, when he assumed his last seagoing command. 
In February 1939, following a shakedown cruise to Monrovia, Liberia; and Cape Town, Union of South Africa, McCandlish's Boise joined Division 9, Cruisers, Battle Force, at San Pedro, California. On December 4, 1941, Boise arrived at Manila, Philippine Islands.

Governor of Guam
McCandlish served as Naval Governor of Guam from March 27, 1936 to February 8, 1938. Along with others in the U.S. Naval Command, he placed emphasis on basic hygiene education for the island's children, often in a dictatorial manner resented by some Chamorro. He discouraged a mission of the Guam Congress to the federal government, instead instructing them to look toward the numerous welfare agencies he had set up on the island. The Congress sent the mission regardless, and ceased to accept funds from the Navy.

World War II service
In 1940, prior to World War II, Capt. McCandlish was selected to serve as Captain of the Norfolk Navy Yard in Portsmouth, Virginia, was promoted to flag rank as Commodore (pay grade 0-7) in April 1943, and commanded the Moroccan Sea Frontier from October 13, 1943 to August 1, 1945.

Personal life
On June 12, 1914 in Manila, Philippine Islands, McCandlish married Margarita Wilson Wood (1892–1954).

On August 25, 1954, McCandlish's wife Margherita Wood McCandlish died in a hospital in Hartsville, South Carolina. McCandlish is interred at Blandford Cemetery in Petersburg, Virginia.

In Darlington, South Carolina, McCandlish married Louise Sligh Brown (Maiden, 1904–1988), former wife of Gustave Waldeck Sligh 
He retired as a commodore, settled in Darlington, became a well-known society figure.

On 16 October 1975, McCandlish died in Darlington, South Carolina. McCandlish is interred at Blandford Cemetery in Petersburg, Virginia.

McCandlish's sister Elsie Gray McCandlish married F.A. Miller.

Awards 
 Navy Cross 
 Legion of Merit

Navy Cross Citation
"The President of the United States of America takes pleasure in presenting the Navy Cross to Lieutenant Commander Benjamin Vaughan McCandlish, United States Navy, for distinguished service in the line of his profession as Commanding Officer of the U.S.S. DAVIS. engaged in the important, exacting, and hazardous duty of patrolling the waters infested with enemy submarines and mines, in escorting and protecting vitally important convoys of troops, and supplies through these waters, and in offensive and defensive action, vigorously and unremittingly prosecuted against all forms of enemy naval activity during World War I."

References

External links 
 Benjamin Vaughan McCandlish at ourcampaigns.com
 Benjamin Vaughan McCandlish at findagrave.com
 Louise McCandish at findagrave.com (wife #2)

1886 births
1975 deaths
Burials at Blandford Cemetery
Recipients of the Navy Cross (United States)
Governors of Guam
People from Petersburg, Virginia
United States Naval Academy alumni
United States Navy personnel of World War I
United States Navy personnel of World War II